Wheeler Springs is an unincorporated community in Houston County, Texas.

History 
Wheeler Springs is located on Farm to Market Road 229, about 12 miles northwest of Crockett.  It is believed to have been founded before 1900.  The small community had a school, church, and a few houses.  After World War II, the school closed and is now a ghost town, save a few widely scattered houses.

Education 
Wheeler Springs is in both the Crockett and Grapeland Independent School Districts.

References 

Unincorporated communities in Houston County, Texas
Unincorporated communities in Texas